Veleslavín is a district of Prague, part of Prague 6, situated in the west of the city approximately 5 km from Ruzyně International Airport. It was probably founded in the 10th or 11th century, first recorded in records from the nearby Břevnov Monastery, and has been part of Prague since 1922. , 6,548 people live here.

Veleslavín chateau, a single-floored baroque chateau located at the address Veleslavínská 1, is recorded as a cultural monument. The southern part of Veleslavín is part of the housing estate named Petřiny, the remainder of which is in Břevnov, and contains a number of modernist buildings designed by Vlado Milunić.

See also
Praha-Veleslavín railway station
Nádraží Veleslavín (Prague Metro)
Daniel Adam z Veleslavína, lexicographer and writer

References

Districts of Prague